Hero's Island, also known as The Land We Love, is a 1962 American action film written and directed by Leslie Stevens. It stars James Mason, Neville Brand, Kate Manx, Rip Torn, Warren Oates and Brendan Dillon. It was released on September 16, 1962, by United Artists.

The film, set in the early 18th century, is about a poor family homesteading on a remote Carolina island, leading to encounters with seagoing vagabonds, good and bad. It was filmed on location on California's Santa Catalina Island, which is much hillier and more arid than any actual part of the coastal Carolinas.

Plot

Cast 
James Mason as Jacob Weber
Neville Brand as Kingstree
Kate Manx as Devon Mainwaring
Rip Torn as Nicholas Gates
Warren Oates as Wayte Giddens
Brendan Dillon as Thomas Mainwaring
Dean Stanton as Dixey Gates
Robert Sampson as Enoch Gates
Morgan Mason as Cullen
Darby Hinton as Jafar
John Hudkins as Bullock
Bobby Johnson as Pound 
William Hart as Meggett

References

External links 
 
 

1962 films
1960s action drama films
American action drama films
1960s English-language films
United Artists films
Films set in the 1710s
Films set in North Carolina
Films set on islands
1960s historical films
American historical films
1962 drama films
Films scored by Dominic Frontiere
Films directed by Leslie Stevens
1960s American films